Chang Chung-huei (born 15 July 1936) is a Taiwanese judoka. He competed in the men's heavyweight event at the 1964 Summer Olympics.

References

1936 births
Living people
Taiwanese male judoka
Olympic judoka of Taiwan
Judoka at the 1964 Summer Olympics
Place of birth missing (living people)